Madison Starke Perry (1814 – March 1865) was the fourth Governor of Florida.

Early life
Madison Starke Perry was born in Lancaster County, South Carolina, the youngest child of Benjamin Perry and his wife Mary Starke. He attended South Carolina College, where he was a member of the Euphradian Society.

He came to Florida in the 1830s and became a leader among the area's plantation owners. He was elected in 1849 to represent the county in the Florida House of Representatives. The following year he was elected to the Florida Senate.

Perry as governor
Perry ran for and was elected governor in 1856, assuming office on October 5, 1857. As Florida's fourth governor, Perry helped bring about the settlement of a long-standing boundary dispute with Georgia and encouraged the building of railways in the state. During the years before the Civil War, Governor Perry foresaw the possibility that Florida might secede from the Union, and in 1858 he urged the reestablishment of the state's militia. Florida did secede three years later, on January 10, 1861. Perry then called for the evacuation of all federal troops from Florida, intending to replace them with the militia.

Last years
After his term as governor ended on October 7, 1861, Perry served as colonel of the 7th Florida Infantry Regiment until illness forced his resignation on April 30, 1863. He retired to his plantation in Rochelle, where he died in March 1865, shortly before the end of the American Civil War. Survived by his wife and two children, he was buried in Oak Ridge Cemetery in Rochelle.

The city of Perry, Florida, is named in his honor. The city of Starke, Florida, may have been named in his honor.  Madison County is named after President James Madison.

Notes

External links
Perry, Florida web site
Starke, Florida web site
Florida Division of Historical Resources web site
 Biography at National Governors Association
History of the 7th Florida Regiment
Official Governor's portrait and biography from the State of Florida

American people of Welsh descent
Democratic Party governors of Florida
People of Florida in the American Civil War
1814 births
1865 deaths
People from Lancaster County, South Carolina
American city founders
People from Alachua County, Florida
Confederate States of America state governors
19th-century American politicians